Rao Bahadur Govind Sakharam Sardesai (17 May 1865 – 29 November 1959), popularly known as Riyasatkar Sardesai, was a historian from Maharashtra, India.

Through his Riyasats written in Marathi, Sardesai presented an account of over 1,000 years of the Indian history until 1848. He also wrote the three-volume New History of Marathas in English.

Sardesai's work was recognised with a Padma Bhushan award from the Government of India in 1957.

Biography 

Sardesai was born in a middle-class Brahmin family in the village of Gowil in Ratnagiri District. He received his high school education in Ratnagiri, and college education in Pune and Mumbai. Then he joined  the service of the princely state of Baroda in 1889. Shortly thereafter, Maharaja Sayajirao Gaekwad III appointed him as his personal secretary, and subsequently as a tutor of the princes.

With encouragement from the Maharaja and availing himself of access to the large collection of books and historical papers in the royal library, Sardesai compiled voluminous historical data and wrote several books.

He often accompanied the Maharaja during the latter's trips to the UK, US, and Europe; this helped Sardesai to broaden his outlook of history.

Sardesai wrote eight volumes of Marathi Riyasat, three volumes of Musalmani Riyasat, and two volumes of British Riyasat.

Historian Tryambak Shankar Shejwalkar had worked as his assistant in the above endeavour. Shejwalkar had written the preface to one of his volumes on Peshwas; Sardesai asked him to write the preface because Shejwalkar held some contrary historical views.

After retiring from service at Baroda state in 1925, Sardesai settled in the village of Kamshet near Pune. In accord with a suggestion from Jadunath Sarkar, the government of Bombay asked Sardesai to take up the work of editing and publishing Peshwa daftar. He examined almost 35,000 documents, comprising 27,332 in Modi Marathi; 7,482 in English; 129 in Gujarati; and 29 in Persian. Subsequently, he published 45 volumes of Peshwa daftar consisting of 7,801 pages and covering 8,650 documents.

Later, jointly with Sarkar, Sardesai edited and published Poona Residency Correspondence consisting of 7,193 pages and covering 4,159 letters. With the help of some newly discovered sources, he wrote at his age 80, The New History of Marathas.

Sardesai died at Kamshet on 29 November 1959 at the age of 94.

Works
Sardasai wrote all of his works in Marathi except for the last three in the following list, which he had written in English.
Musalmani Riyasat
Marathi Riyasat
British Riyasat
Peshwe Daftar
Aitihasik Wanshawali
Aitihasik Gharani
Aitihasik Patrawyawahar
Aitihasik Patrabodh
Mahadaji Shinde Yanchi Patre
Anupuran
Paramanand Kawyam
Sardesai Gharanyacha Itihas
Shyamkantachi Patre
Poona Residency Correspondence
Main Currents of Maratha History
The New History of Marathas

Honours
1937 - Honoured with the title 'Rao Bahadur'
1946 - Golden Award with the title 'Itihas Martand' at Dhule
1947 - Honoured by Baroda State
1951 - President, Bharatiya Itihas Parishad
1951 - Doctor of Literature conferred by University of Pune
1957 - Padma Bhushan award from the Government of India

References

Biography in Marathi Riyasat Volume I
Autobiography Majhi Sansaryatra
Shejwalkar Lekh Sangraha by Tryambak Shankar Shejwalkar
Riyasatkar Sardesai by Prof. S. S. Puranik
Riyasatkar by Prof. S. S. Puranik
Rishitarpan by Prof. S. S. Puranik (2014)  (ऋषितर्पण - प्रा. श. श्री. पुराणिक)

See also
List of Historians
List of historians by area of study
List of Padmabhushan
List of Marathi people

1865 births
1959 deaths
Marathi-language writers
Recipients of the Padma Bhushan in literature & education
People from Ratnagiri district
19th-century Indian historians
History of Maharashtra
20th-century Indian historians